Umm al Rizam  is a town in eastern Libya.

Notes

See also 
 List of cities in Libya

External links

Populated places in Derna District
Baladiyat of Libya